is an important English tort law case, concerning the rule in Rylands v. Fletcher.

Facts
Transco plc (British Gas come commercial) had sued the council for repairs of £93,681.55 underneath one of its pipes in Brinnington. The ground beneath the gas pipe had washed away when the council’s water pipe leaked.

Judgment
The Lords held that because the quantities of water from an ordinary pipe is not dangerous or unnatural in the course of things, the council was not liable. Lord Hoffmann, however, remarked on the irony that had the pipe belonged to a ‘water undertaker’ s.209 Water Industry Act 1991 creates strict liability unless (with further irony) the loss is to a Gas Act 1986 company.

Their Lordships protected the rule in Rylands v. Fletcher but within strict confines. The escape must be of something dangerous, out of the ordinary, which did not include a burst waterpipe on council property. Unlike the Australian High Court, whose abolition of the doctrine in Burnie Port Authority v. General Jones Pty (1994) 179 CLR 520 was given severe doubt, their Lordships stated their purpose,

See also
English tort law
Act of God

Notes

External links
 Transco plc v. Stockport Metropolitan Borough Council (2003) UKHL 61

English tort case law
English nuisance cases
House of Lords cases
2003 in case law
2003 in British law
2000s in Greater Manchester
Metropolitan Borough of Stockport